Sara Conti (born 2 August 2000) is an Italian pair skater. With her skating partner, Niccolò Macii, she is the 2023 European champion, the 2022–23 Grand Prix Final bronze medalist, the 2022 MK John Wilson Trophy silver medalist, the 2022 Skate Canada International bronze medalist, 2023 Italian national champion, and a three-time Italian national bronze medalist (2020–2022). They are the first (and to date, only) Italian pair to win gold at the European Championships.

As a singles skater, Conti is the 2019 Sofia Trophy bronze medalist and the 2018 Denkova-Staviski Cup bronze medalist.

Programs

With Macii

Competitive highlights 
GP: Grand Prix; CS: Challenger Series

Pairs with Macii

Ladies' singles

Detailed results 
ISU Personal best in bold.

 With Macii

References

External links 
 
 
 

2000 births
Living people
Italian female pair skaters
Italian female single skaters
21st-century Italian women